Nanophyllium brevipenne, is a species of phasmid or leaf insect of the genus Nanophyllium. It is found in New Guinea, and Sri Lanka.

References

Phylliidae
Phasmatodea of Asia
Insects described in 1992